Eugen Jørgensen (13 May 1858 – 1 September 1910) was a Danish architect and local politician. His apartment building at Strandboulevarden 35 in Copenhagen has been listed on the Danish registry of protected buildings and places. Other works include Østerfælled Barracks and the belongs Christian IX's Gade.

Early life and education
Jørgen was born on 13 May 1858 in Frederikssund, the son of Christian Erhard Jærgensen Veng (1827–1906) and Eugénie Françoise Eva Vincent (1834–1906). He graduated from Metropolitanskolen in 1875 and apprenticed as a mason before enrolling at the Royal Danish Academy of Fine Arts in 1877. He studied under Hans Jørgen Holm and graduated as an architect from the Academy in 1884. He won the Neuhausen Award in 1889.

Other engagements
Jørgensen was a co-editor of the magazine  from 1898 to 1905. He was a member of Copenhagen City Council from 1904 to 10. He was also involved in the question of architects' preliminary education.

Personal life
Jørgensen married Camilla Maria Permin (3 October 1858 – 27 January 1940) on 27 September 1887. He died on 1 September 1910 and is buried in Assistens Cemetery.

Selected works
 Military Equestrian School, Kong Georgs Vej/Nordre Fasanvej 122, Frederiksberg (1890–1891, demolished)
 Østerfælled Barracks, Copenhagen (1896–1898, under instructions of engineer captain  Bierring, adapted and partly demolished in 1993–1995)
 Østerbrogade 84, Copenhagen (1898–1900)
 Ringsted Børs, Ringsted (1897–1898)
 Villa Ejstrup, Hveensvej, Vedbæk (1903–1904)
 Kong Georgs Vej/Kronprinsesse Sophies Vej, Frederiksberg (1900)
  Strandboulevarden 35 (1902–1903, listed)
 Edvard Brandes' house, Olof Palmes Gade 8 (then Skjoldsgade), Copenhagen (1902–1903)
 Frederik VI's Allé 1–11, 2–14, Frederiksberg (1905)
 Christian IX's Gade, Copenhagen (1906–1910)

Image gallery

References

Kunstindeks Danmark

 Eugen Jørgensen at Kunstindeks Danmark

1858 births
1910 deaths
20th-century Danish architects
20th-century Copenhagen City Council members
Royal Danish Academy of Fine Arts alumni
People from Frederikssund Municipality
Burials at Assistens Cemetery (Copenhagen)